Jayam is a 2002 Indian Telugu-language romantic action drama film written, produced and directed by Teja under the banner, Chitram Movies.The film stars Nithiin, Sadha, and Gopichand. and music was composed by R. P. Patnaik. The film went on to become a huge hit both critically and commercially. Performances of actors and the music was well received and appreciated by the viewers and critics. It was remade by M. Raja in Tamil with the same title in 2003 with Sadha and Gopichand reprising their roles.

Plot

In a village, the parents of first cousins Sujatha and Raghu decide that the children will marry one another when they grow up. Raghu is seen to be arrogant and negatively shaded since young. He smokes and steals money from his father to gamble. Once when Raghu attacks Sujatha's classmate when he helps her, Sujatha breaks all bonds with Raghu. When Raghu's family moves to another village, Sujatha and Raghu do not even say goodbye to each other. Meanwhile, Raghu's father gifts Sujatha with silver anklets and requests her to never remove them, to which she obliges. Several years pass by. Raghu and Sujatha are very distanced. Sujatha grows up to be a beautiful teenage girl, whereas Raghu becomes a rogue and a womanizer. Every time his mother speaks of Sujatha, he feels disgusted. He goes to the extent of sleeping with his servant.

Meanwhile, Sujatha goes to college, where she meets Venkat. Venkat is from an extremely poor family and does small jobs to support his single mother, and pay the money lender. He has a decent group of friends, and they are classmates with Sujatha. Venkat has an instant crush on Sujatha, which Sujatha does not reciprocate. Venkat asks Sujatha to come to the temple festival, to which she refuses. But in the end, Sujatha comes, indicating that she is in love with Venkat. Venkat and Sujatha start dating and communicate with each other on the train by writing to each other on the blackboard at the side of the train.

Once, when building up the courage to board the same compartment in the train as Venkat, Sujatha is spotted by the family astrologer. She goes home scared, and as she had expected, the astrologer had told Sujatha's father. Her father tells her that she would be married to Raghu just as was decided years ago. Sujatha protests, but her father stays firm. This results in Sujatha dropping out of college and staying at home.

Raghu comes for the engagement reluctantly (still thinking of their childhood encounter), but instantly falls for her the moment he sees her. He warns Sujatha that she would never go away and marry him in the end. They both are engaged. Sujatha has a younger sister Kalyani, who turns out to be the messenger between her and Venkat. She gives a message to Venkat to meet Sujatha at the temple. The whole family goes to the temple after the engagement, and there Sujatha sees Venkat waiting for her. She is spotted talking to Venkat by Raghu and his gang, and they mercilessly beat him up. Traumatized, Sujatha runs to her father, but Raghu indirectly warns her family that things would turn out wrong if Venkat is seen anywhere near Sujatha.

He then mysteriously comes into Raghu's home and writes that he would be the one marrying Sujatha in the end, in blood, triggering Raghu. Fearing that Venkat would come and take Sujatha away, Raghu sends his men to Venkat's house. They trash the whole house and the things inside, sparing his mother. His mother tells Venkat's friends that he should come back with Sujatha, and if he does not, she herself would kill him. The same thing happens in Sujatha's home on their wedding day he writes he will take Sujatha at 7:00. Raghu, in a rush, asks the family to hurry and complete the wedding. Sujatha goes into the room to change, but in reality, she is waiting for Venkat, after seeing his message on the wall. Raghu comes and breaks open the door, and at the same time, Venkat comes through the roof and rescues Sujatha.

Angered and defeated, Raghu goes after the couple, and a chase ensues, which results in Venkat getting wounded by Raghu. The couple and Venkat's friend who helped them, escape in the train with the help of the conductor. But Raghu enters the train with his men, and the couple escape to the roof, where they are cornered. To save themselves, they jump off the train and roll down to a forest. To their shock, Raghu and his men come there as well. After gaining confidence from Sujatha, he fights with Raghu. Raghu is defeated in a face-to-face combat with Venkat, and Venkat marries Sujatha.

Cast

 Nithiin as Venkataramana
 Sadha as Sujatha, Venkataramana's Love interest 
 Gopichand as Raghu
 Siva Krishna as Sujatha's father
 Prasad Babu as Raghu's father
 Dharmavarapu Subramanyam
 Chittajalu Lakshmipathy
 Suman Setty as Ali Baba
 Supreeth
 Rallapalli Narasimha as priest
 Duvvasi Mohan
 Satti Babu
 Jenny
 Shakeela as Gnana Saraswathi
 Delhi Rajeswari as Sujatha's mother
 Srilakshmi as Nurse
 Alapati Lakshmi
 Nirmala Reddy

Soundtrack

Music was composed by R. P. Patnaik. Lyrics were penned by Kulasekhar. Music was released on ADITYA Music Company.

Reception 
A critic from The Hindu wrote that "The film is a visual delight especially in song situations". Jeevi of Idlebrain.com and a critic from Full Hyderabad called the film "average".

Accolades

Notes

References

External links
 

2002 films
Telugu films remade in other languages
Films directed by Teja (film director)
Films set on trains
2002 romantic drama films
Films scored by R. P. Patnaik
2000s Telugu-language films
Indian romantic drama films
Indian romantic action films
2000s romantic action films